Siddharth Randeria is an Indian actor of Gujarati theatre and films.

Biography
Siddharth Randeria was born on 17 December 1955 in Mumbai, India to Gujarati writer and stage actor Madhukar Randeria. His son Ishaan Randeria is also associated with stage and cinema.

Randeria is known for his Gujarati comedy plays for which he has won multiple awards as a writer, director and actor. He is involved in theatre since 1970 and performed as lead actor in many plays and over the last 50 years holds the record for the most live performances by an actor, crossing over 12,000 live performances till date. His Gujjubhai series started with Gujjubhai E Gaam Gajaavyu in 2002. Lage Raho Gujjubhai (2007) completed 800 shows in three years across the world, creating a new record on Gujarati Stage. Other Gujjubhai plays; Gujjubhai E Gaam Gajavyu, Lo Gujjubhai Ghode Chadya, Gujjubhai ni Golmaal (2012) completed 350 shows across the world. His Gujjubhai Banya Dabangg has completed 505 shows in 18 months.

He debuted in Gujarati cinema in 2015 with his successful film Gujjubhai The Great. He also appeared its sequel, GujjuBhai - Most Wanted (2018). He played a cameo in Wrong Side Raju (2016). He played the lead role in Natsamrat (2018) which was a remake of 2016 Marathi film of the same name., For which he won the prestigious Dada Saheb Phalke Award. His Chaal Jeevi Laiye! (2019) became the highest grossing Gujarati film of all time, breaking all previous records, running in theatres for over a year.

Plays and films

Plays 

Gujjubhai series:
Gujjubhai E Gaam Gajavyu (2003)
Lage Raho Gujjubhai (2007)
Lo Gujjubhai Ghode Chadya (2010)
Gujjubhai ni Golmaal (2012)
Gujjubhai Banya Dabangg (2015)
Rang Rangila Gujjubhai (2017)
Bluffmaster Gujjubhai (2019)
Aa Sansar Che Rang Rangilo
Ajab Karamat
Amari Duniya Tamari Duniya,
Amme Lai Gaya Tamme Rahi Gaya
Bas Kar Bakula
Best of Luck
Bhai
Carry On Lalu
Ek Soneri Sawar
Gurubrahma
Jaadu Teri Nazar
Janma Daata
Khandan
Mantra Mugdh
Mission East Pakistan
Parnela Chaiye Kone Kahiye
Pati Naame Patangiyu
Prem No Public Issue
Ramat Shooniya Chaukadini
Rang Che Rajja
Saatmi Dikri nu Saatmu Santan
Sacha Bola Joothalal
Shrimaan Virudh Shrimati
Tu j Mari Mausam
Vaat Bahaar Jay Nahi

Filmography 

Gujjubhai The Great (2015)
Wrong Side Raju (2016, cameo)
GujjuBhai - Most Wanted (2018)
Natsamrat (2018)
Chaal Jeevi Laiye! (2019)
Kehvatlal Parivar (2022)

He has also appeared in some Bollywood films including Khalnayak, Kya Kehna and Shortkut as well as in a number of TV serials such as Waqt Ki Raftar and Kudkudiya House No. 43.

References

External links
 
 

1955 births
Living people
Male actors in Gujarati-language films
Male actors from Mumbai
Indian theatre directors
Gujarati people
Indian male stage actors
20th-century Indian male actors
21st-century Indian male actors